The Book of Common Prayer is the primary liturgical book used in the Anglican Communion. Book of Common Prayer may also refer to:

Liturgical books
 Book of Common Prayer (1549), the first Book of Common Prayer
 Book of Common Prayer (1552), the second Book of Common Prayer
 Book of Common Prayer (1604), the fourth Book of Common Prayer
 Book of Common Prayer (1662), an authorised liturgical book of the Church of England and the basis for numerous other editions of the Book of Common Prayer
 Book of Common Prayer (1928), an unadopted revised version of the 1662 Book of Common Prayer of the Church of England
 Book of Common Prayer (1929), commonly known as the Scottish Prayer Book, an official liturgical book of the Scottish Episcopal Church
 Book of Common Prayer (1962), an authorized liturgical book of the Anglican Church of Canada
 Book of Common Prayer (1979), the official primary liturgical book of the U.S.-based Episcopal Church
 Book of Common Prayer (1984), an authorised liturgical book of the Church in Wales
 Book of Common Prayer (Unitarian), revisions of the 1662 prayer book according to Unitarian theology

Printings
 Book of Common Prayer (1843 illustrated version), an illustrated version of the 1790 edition Book of Common Prayer of the American Episcopal Church
 Book of Common Prayer (1845 illuminated version), an illuminated and illustrated version of the 1662 Book of Common Prayer for the use of the United Church of England and Ireland

Other uses
 A Book of Common Prayer, a 1977 novel by Joan Didion
 Common Prayer (band)
 Custodian of the Standard Book of Common Prayer, an office with canonical responsibilities in churches of North American Anglicanism